Camphers Santiago Pérez Bermúdez, known as Camphers Pérez (born 13 May 1998) is a Nicaraguan football player. He plays for Managua.

International
He made his Nicaragua national football team debut on 22 March 2018 in a friendly against Cuba.

He was selected for the 2019 CONCACAF Gold Cup squad.

References

External links
 
 

1998 births
People from Managua Department
Living people
Nicaraguan men's footballers
Nicaragua international footballers
Association football defenders
Managua F.C. players
Nicaraguan Primera División players
2019 CONCACAF Gold Cup players